Wadi Ar Ruqub is a wadi of Yemen, It flows past the village of Al Khayalah. The wadi flooded in October 2008, affecting this village.

References

Wadis of Yemen